The Covenant is a 1985 American television horror film directed by Walter Grauman and starring Jane Badler, Kevin Conroy, Judy Parfitt, Michelle Phillips, and José Ferrer. Its plot follows a group of people attempting to stop a powerful, Satanic family controlling the world's banks.

Cast

References

Sources

External links

1985 horror films
1985 television films
1985 films
American supernatural horror films
Films about conspiracy theories
Films directed by Walter Grauman
1980s American films